USS Mary M (SP-3274) was a United States Navy motor launch in commission from 1919 to 1922.

Mary M was built as a civilian motorboat of the same name in 1904 at Sharptown, Maryland. In 1919, the U.S. Navy acquired her from her owner, the J. G. White Engineering Company, and assigned her the section patrol number SP-3274.

Assigned to the 5th Naval District, Mary M served as a launch at Indian Head, Maryland, until sold on 1 May 1922.

Notes

References
 
 SP-3274 Mary M at Department of the Navy Naval History and Heritage Command Online Library of Selected Images: U.S. Navy Ships -- Listed by Hull Number "SP" #s and "ID" #s -- World War I Era Patrol Vessels and other Acquired Ships and Craft numbered from SP-3200 through SP-3299
 NavSource Online: Section Patrol Craft Photo Archive Mary M (SP 3274)

Auxiliary ships of the United States Navy
Ships built in Maryland
1904 ships